Kirby Cross is a village in Tendring district, Essex, England. It is situated near to Kirby-le-Soken and Frinton-on-Sea. Historically, Kirby Cross was a hamlet within the parish of Kirby-le-Soken, but since 1934 both settlements have been part of Frinton and Walton civil parish.

It is the location of Kirby Cross railway station on the Sunshine Coast branch of the Great Eastern Main Line.

Notes

External links

Villages in Essex
Tendring